George Warhop (born September 19, 1961) is an American football coach who most recently was the offensive line coach for the Houston Texans of the National Football League (NFL). He previously served as the offensive line coach for the Jacksonville Jaguars, Tampa Bay Buccaneers, Cleveland Browns, San Francisco 49ers, Dallas Cowboys, Arizona Cardinals and St. Louis Rams.

Coaching career

Early career
Warhop was named the offensive line coach of the Kansas Jayhawks on January 11, 1986. He was named the offensive line coach for Vanderbilt on February 21, 1989. After coaching the Commodores in 1989, Warhop resigned on December 13, 1989, and took the New Mexico offensive line coaching job on December 17, 1989. After coaching the Lobos in 1990, Warhop resigned and became the offensive coordinator for the London Monarchs of the World League of American Football. Warhop spent two seasons with the Monarchs before he was hired as the offensive line coach for Southern Methodist on February 17, 1993. He spent the summer of 1994 as a minority intern for the Denver Broncos of the National Football League. From 1994–1995 Warhop worked as the offensive line coach for Boston College.

St. Louis Rams
On February 8, 1996, Warhop was hired by the St. Louis Rams as their co-offensive line coach. In the 1997 NFL Draft the Rams took offensive tackle Orlando Pace with the first overall selection. Pace held out of training camp for three weeks to get a bigger contract, and Warhop was angry, stating that Pace "lost a good part of the year." In an attempt to speed up the playbook-learning process, Warhop was assigned as a special tutor for Pace.

Arizona Cardinals
On February 10, 1998, Warhop was hired by the Arizona Cardinals as their offensive line coach. His contract expired at the conclusion of the 2002 season, and was not re-signed.

Dallas Cowboys
On January 16, 2003, Warhop was hired by the Dallas Cowboys as their offensive line coach, following his tenure with the Cardinals. In 2003 and 2004 the Cowboys' offensive line only allowed 37 sacks, while in 2002, the year before Warhop was hired, they surrendered 54 sacks. After two seasons with the Cowboys, Warhop was fired on January 7, 2005. Shortly after he was fired, he interviewed for the Florida State Seminoles' offensive line coach position, but did not get the job.

San Francisco 49ers
On January 27, 2005, Warhop was hired by the San Francisco 49ers as their offensive line coach. In 2006 Warhop's offensive line allowed a league-worst 55 sacks, and the 49ers hired a second offensive line coach, Chris Foerster, to share the duties. Warhop was fired in-season on October 23, 2008 after his offensive line gave up a league-worst 29 sacks to that point.

Cleveland Browns
On February 4, 2009, Warhop was hired by the Cleveland Browns as their offensive line coach.

Tampa Bay Buccaneers
In 2014, Warhop was hired by the Tampa Bay Buccaneers as their offensive line coach under head coach Lovie Smith. Warhop was retained under head coach Dirk Koetter.

Jacksonville Jaguars
On January 13, 2019, Warhop was hired by the Jacksonville Jaguars as their offensive line coach under head coach Doug Marrone. On January 19, 2021, Warhop was retained under the new head coach of the Jaguars, Urban Meyer.

Houston Texans
On February 21, 2022, Warhop was hired by the Houston Texans as their offensive line coach. He was not retained for the 2023 season.

References

External links
 Jacksonville Jaguars profile
 Tampa Bay Buccaneers profile

1961 births
Living people
American football centers
Arizona Cardinals coaches
Boston College Eagles football coaches
Cincinnati Bearcats football coaches
Cincinnati Bearcats football players
Cleveland Browns coaches
Dallas Cowboys coaches
Kansas Jayhawks football coaches
London Monarchs coaches
New Mexico Lobos football coaches
San Francisco 49ers coaches
SMU Mustangs football coaches
St. Louis Rams coaches
Tampa Bay Buccaneers coaches
Vanderbilt Commodores football coaches
Mt. San Jacinto Eagles football players
Sportspeople from Riverside, California
African-American coaches of American football
African-American players of American football
San Jacinto College alumni
Jacksonville Jaguars coaches
Players of American football from Riverside, California
Houston Texans coaches